Yellow Shoe may refer to:

Yellow Indian Shoe
Charles B. Lohmiller, known as "Yellow Shoes"